Channel M is a DAB+ radio station for the Munhwa Broadcasting Corporation and is also South Korea's first DAB+ station.

References

References 

Radio stations in South Korea
Munhwa Broadcasting Corporation